Surathkal railway station is one of the main railway stations of Mangalore city along with Mangalore Central railway station and Mangalore Junction railway station and is located in north Mangaluru. Twenty-two trains stop here.KRCL operates RO-RO services from Suratkal to Verna, Kolad, and Karembeli. As per the Konkan railway map, Surathkal railway station is at a distance of 733.825 kilometers from the northern starting point of the Konkan railway line at Roha and 4.615 kilometers from Thokur which is the southern endpoint of Konkan railway jurisdiction. The Surathkal railway station is at distance of 26.285 Kilometre from Mangaluru Central(MAQ) railway station.

The station has only one platform and a single diesel broad gauge track. During the landslides that occurred in August 2019 at Padil-Kulashekar railway section in Mangaluru, several trains were terminated at Surathkal railway stations. Again from 6-2-2023 to 3-3-2023 due to works carried between Padil and Jokatte section many trains were short terminated at Suratkal railway station, the trains were 12133/12134 CSMT- Manguluru Junction Express and Madgaon- Mangaluru Central Express (10107/10108). There is an urgent need of constructing another platform at Surathkal railway station to handle such emergencies as well as increasing number of passengers.
 
Surathkal railway station has a tea stall, a waiting room, and a running room. Rolling IN and Rolling OUT of RORO rakes are carried here.

Background

Surathkal is a suburb of Mangalore city located on National Highway 66 (earlier known as National Highway 17) in the Dakshina Kannada district, Karnataka state, India on the shore of the Arabian Sea. It is a municipality merged with Mangalore City Corporation. It lies between the Gurupura (Phalguni) and Pavanje (Nandini) rivers. It is considered as the northernmost area of Mangalore City Corporation geographical limits. Surathkal is six kilometers north of New Mangalore sea port (NMPT). The nearest airport is Mangalore International Airport (IXE/VOML) at fifteen kilometers away from Surathkal railway station. Mangalore petroleum refinery (MRPL) is three kilometers from this railway station. National Institute of Technology, Karnataka (formerly KREC) is at distance of two kilometers from Suratkal railway station.

Location
The Surathkal railway station is located 22 meters above mean sea level. The entrance to the railway station is from Surathkal-Bajpe Road now known as Surathkal-MRPL road. The Surathkal railway station is just 500 meters east of national highway NH-66. There is a bus-stop at the entrance of the railway station where one can get city buses to Hampankatta, Panambur, Kulai, Kulur, Mangalore, Kankanady, Krishnapura, Katipalla, and Bajpe.

Trains
The following trains have a stop at Surathkal railway station in both directions:

 Matsyagandha Express (12619/12620)
 Netravati Express (16346/16345)
 Mumbai CSMT–Mangaluru Junction Express (12133/12134)
 SBC–Karwar Express (16513/16514)
 SBC-Karwar Express (16523/16524)
 Gandhidham-Nagaracoil Express(16335-16336)
 NCJ Express(06335-06336)
 Hapa Express (16337/163338)
 Madgaon–Mangalore Intercity Express (22635/22636)
 Mangalore–Madgaon Passenger (56640/566641)
 Mangalore–Madgaon DEMU (70105/70106)
 Yeshvantpur–Karwar Express (16515/16516)

Some special trains running through Konkan railway route have stop at Surathkal railroad station.

Western Railway zone and Konkan Railway Corporation have announced that Ganapati festival special (fully reserved) trains will be run from Mumbai Central(MMCT) to Surathkal(SL) and vice versa. The train number 09183 will leave Mumbai Central at 11.55p.m on 8 September 2021 and 15 September 2021 C.E. and reach Surathkal at 8p.m next day. Train 09184 will start from Suratkal at 9.15 p.m on 9 September 2021 A.D. and 16 September 2021 and reach Mumbai central at 8.55p.m next day. The coach composition of 09183 and 09184 will be Two coaches of 2 tier Air conditioned,Eight coaches of 3 tier A.C, Two sleeper coaches along with one pantry car and two generator coaches.  These will be the first train to officially terminate and originate at Surathkal railway station. Winter Special train ( 01453/01454) running from LTT(Mumbai) terminates at Surathkal from 31 January 2023.

References

Railway stations in Dakshina Kannada district
Railway stations along Konkan Railway line
Railway stations opened in 1997
Karwar railway division